Maria of Vitebsk (died before 1349) was the first wife of Algirdas, future Grand Duke of Lithuania (marriage took place around 1318). 

Very little is known about her life. The only child of a Russian prince Yaroslav, Maria was the only heir to the Principality of Vitebsk. After her father's death ca. 1345, Vitebsk fell permanently under control of Algirdas and other Gediminids. 

Maria gave birth to five sons, all of whom grew up while Algirdas was still only a regional duke in Christianized lands of the Grand Duchy of Lithuania. All five sons were baptized in Orthodox rite and ruled Russian lands giving rise to prominent clans of Russian dukes (Trubetskoy family from Demetrius I Starshy, Czartoryski family from Constantine, Sanguszko family from Fiodor, Belsky and Olelkovich families from Vladimir). 

After Maria's death, Algirdas married another Russian princess, Uliana of Tver. After Algirdas' death, the eldest sons of Maria and Uliana battled over succession rights.

See also
 Family of Algirdas

References

1340s deaths
People from Vitebsk
Russian princesses
Grand Duchesses of Lithuania
Year of birth unknown
14th-century Lithuanian people
14th-century Lithuanian women
14th-century Russian people
14th-century Russian women